Ancil Brandon Farrier (born 21 July 1986) is a Trinidadian footballer who last played college soccer in the United States for the Southern Connecticut State University. He has also played international football for the Trinidad and Tobago, earning four caps in 2008.

External links
Profile at SocaWarriors 

Ancil Farrier international statistics at Caribbean Football Database
Ancil Farrier player profile at SCSU - 2007
Ancil Farrier player profile at SCSU - 2008

1986 births
Living people
Trinidad and Tobago footballers
Trinidad and Tobago international footballers
Association football fullbacks